TTML may refer to:
Timed Text Markup Language
Tagged Text Markup Language by Nokia; see Wireless Markup Language